Younger Brother (Spanish: Hermano menor) is a 1953 Spanish drama film directed by Domingo Viladomat and starring Gustavo Rojo, María Rivas and Enrique Guitart.

Synopsis 
Two boys are orphaned by their father, who has committed suicide in the suburbs of a big city. The older brother will make an effort so that his younger sister can study.

Cast
In alphabetical order

References

Bibliography 
 Juan Francisco Cerón Gómez. Cien años de cine en Lorca. EDITUM, 1999.

External links 
 

1953 drama films
Spanish drama films
1953 films
1950s Spanish-language films
Spanish black-and-white films
1950s Spanish films